Charlton railway station served the village of Charlton, Northumberland, England from 1861 to 1862 on the Border Counties Railway.

History 
The station was opened on 1 February 1861 by the North British Railway. The station was situated on a lane from Bellingham to Lanehead to the east of the bridge south of Charlton. The platform was made of timber and there was a siding 200 yards east. The station was short-lived, as it was only open for one year and eight months. The siding survived for a bit longer.

References

External links 

Disused railway stations in Northumberland
Former North British Railway stations
Railway stations in Great Britain opened in 1861
Railway stations in Great Britain closed in 1862
1861 establishments in England
1862 disestablishments in England
Bellingham, Northumberland